Sorb may refer to:

Sorbs, a Slavic ethnic group
Sorbus, a genus of trees
Sorbus domestica, a species belonging to the Sorbus genus
Sorbus aucuparia, a species belonging to the Sorbus genus
Sorbus torminalis, a species belonging to the Sorbus genus
 Sorb, the fruit of the true service tree, a.k.a. sorb tree (Sorbus domestica)
Sorption, the action of both absorption and adsorption
SORB, the Sex Offender Registry Board, a Massachusetts government database